Dear Jane may refer to:

 Dear Jane (band), a Hong Kong band
 Dear Jane, the self-titled EP by Dear Jane
 Dear Jane (Jane Zhang EP), an EP by Jane Zhang
"Dear Jane", title track of Dear Jane, an EP by Jane Zhang
 Dear Jane (The Madden Brothers song), a song by The Madden Brothers
Dear Jane, a single by Jamie Horton	1962
Dear Jane, a song by White Heat composed Worth 1978